Belconnen Way is a major road in Canberra, Australia. It connects William Hovell Drive and Kingsford Smith Drive in the west to Barry Drive and Fairfax Street, providing access to Civic and the Inner North via Belconnen Town Centre. In addition to being used as an alternate route to the city by commuters from the northern suburbs, it provides the primary connection to the Belconnen Town Center. Along with Barry Drive, Belconnen Way was constructed in stages between 1965 and 1971 as a single carriageway road. It was progressively duplicated as the district's traffic and population grew. A connection to Gungahlin Drive forms the largest signalized and overpass intersection in Canberra, constructed during the Gungahlin Drive Extension works and opening in 2011.

See also

References

Streets in Canberra